Centennial Park Stadium is a 2,200 seat capacity stadium in Toronto, Ontario, Canada. It is primarily used for soccer, track and field, football and occasionally for kabaddi. The park is also used for the ROPSSAA football finals and the PSAA (Private Schools Athletic Association) on the first Monday of May for an annual Track and Field Meet.

The stadium is named for the city park it is located in, which opened during Canada's centennial year of 1967; the stadium was opened in 1975, eight years after the centennial.

It is located within Centennial Park in the Etobicoke district, just south of Toronto Pearson International Airport and near the intersection of Rathburn Road and Renforth Drive. It was built in 1975. The stadium hosted the first edition of Veteran Athletes Championships in 1975 as well. 

The stadium hosted the closing ceremony of the 1976 Summer Paralympics and some of the sporting events.

The stadium has seating in a grandstand on the west side and a small scoreboard on the north end of the field.

The stadium is home to the Toronto Lynx soccer clubs (men's and ladies'). It hosts the Relay For Life in Toronto West event each June, a fundraiser for the Canadian Cancer Society. The stadium hosted the CPSL/CSL Championship finals in 1998, 2010, 2011, and 2014.

In 2017, there were calls and support for the stadium to be renamed after former Mayor Rob Ford as Rob Ford Memorial Stadium, but a city council meeting voted down the motion on October 4, 2017.

References

See also
 Birchmount Stadium – City of Toronto / Toronto District School Board
 Varsity Stadium – University of Toronto
 Esther Shiner Stadium – City of Toronto
 Lamport Stadium – City of Toronto
 Monarch Park Stadium – Toronto District School Board
 Toronto Track and Field Centre – City of Toronto
 Rosedale Field – City of Toronto
 York Lions Stadium – York University

Soccer venues in Canada
Sports venues in Toronto
Etobicoke
Athletics (track and field) venues in Canada
Toronto Lynx
Serbian White Eagles FC
Toronto Croatia
Kabaddi venues
1975 establishments in Ontario
Sports venues completed in 1975